Today's Golfer is a monthly golf magazine which is published by Bauer. It was launched in April 1988  and covers topics such as the latest news in new golfing gear, golf gear tests and reviews, tips from tour pros, course reviews and more.

History
The magazine was launched in April 1988. It was the brainchild of Alun Probert who then went on to also found Fore! magazine; the launch editor was Bill Robertson. Editors have included Bob Warters and Paul Hamblin. The current editor is Chris Jones.

References

External links
 Today's Golfer Official Site

Bauer Group (UK)
Golf magazines
Magazines established in 1998
Sports magazines published in the United Kingdom
Monthly magazines published in the United Kingdom